Black & Blue Records was a record company and label founded in France in 1968 that specialized in blues and jazz.

Black & Blue reissued music from small American labels before producing original releases. Some of these releases were by black musicians who were visiting France. The label's catalogue included music by Cat Anderson, Ray Bryant, Milt Buckner, Panama Francis, Earl Hines, Illinois Jacquet, Jo Jones, Sammy Price, and Buddy Tate.

Roster

 The Aces
 Monty Alexander
 Luther Allison
 Cat Anderson
 Louis Armstrong
 Kokomo Arnold
 Georges Arvanitas
 Harold Ashby
 Marcel Azzola
 Gerard Badini
 Mickey Baker
 Chris Barber
 Barrett Sisters
 Sammy Benskin
 Buster Benton
 François Biensan
 Wallace Bishop
 Little Joe Blue
 Bunny Briggs
 Lonnie Brooks
 Big Bill Broonzy
 Clarence Gatemouth Brown
 Ray Bryant
 Milt Buckner
 Eddie "Guitar" Burns
 Billy Butler
 Don Byas
 Benny Carter
 Al Casey
 Eddie Chamblee
 Doc Cheatham
 Eddy Clearwater
 Arnett Cobb
 Cozy Cole
 Bill Coleman
 Michael Coleman
 Gene Conners
 Johnny Copeland
 Larry Coryell
 Stanley Cowell
 Wallace Davenport
 Eddie Lockjaw Davis
 Larry Davis
 Wild Bill Davis
 Jimmy Dawkins
 Georges Delerue
 Sidney De Paris
 Vic Dickenson
 Lefty Dizz
 Bill Doggett
 Dorothy Donegan
 Dany Doriz
 Bobby Durham
 Harry Edison
 Sleepy John Estes
 David Eyges
 Pat Flowers
 Panama Francis
 Curtis Fuller
 Lowell Fulson
 Roy Gaines
 Leonard Gaskin
 Lloyd Glenn
 Stephane Grappelli
 Chuck Green
 Al Grey
 Tiny Grimes
 Johnny Guarnieri
 François Guin
 Buddy Guy
 Juanita Hall
 Lionel Hampton
 Roland Hanna
 John Hardee
 Bill Harris
 Coleman Hawkins
 J. C. Heard
 Heath Brothers
 Jessie Mae Hemphill
 Earl Hines
 Milt Hinton
 Major Holley
 Richard "Groove" Holmes
 John Lee Hooker
 Claude Hopkins
 Gaël Horellou
 Helen Humes
 J. B. Hutto
 Abdullah Ibrahim
 John Jackson
 Oliver Jackson
 Willis Jackson
 Illinois Jacquet
 Homesick James
 Alain Jean-Marie
 Cousin Joe
 Budd Johnson
 Candy Johnson
 Jimmy Johnson
 Luther "Snake Boy" Johnson
 Hank Jones
 Jo Jones
 Jonah Jones
 Louis Jordan
 Taft Jordan
 George Kelly
 Joe Kennedy Jr.
 Guy Lafitte
 Byard Lancaster
 Ellis Larkins
 Baby Laurence
 Lafayette Leake
 The Legendary Blues Band
 Johnny Letman
 John Littlejohn
 Robert Lockwood Jr.
 Willie Mabon
 Rob McConnell
 Jay McShann
 Christian Morin
 Rose Murphy
 Joe Newman
 Sy Oliver
 Hot Lips Page
 Pinetop Perkins
 Andre Persiany
 Sammy Price
 Alvin Queen
 Ram Ramirez
 Jimmy Raney
 A.C. Reed
 Red Richards
 Gene Rodgers
 Jimmy Rogers
 Jimmy Rowles
 Otis Rush
 Maxim Saury
 Charlie Shavers
 Archie Shepp
 Johnny Shines
 Jimmy Shirley
 Little Mack Simmons
 Jean-Sebastien Simonoviez
 Hal Singer
 Magic Slim
 Memphis Slim
 Sunnyland Slim
 Jimmy Slyde
 Cliff Smalls
 Byther Smith
 Carrie Smith
 Floyd Smith
 Rex Stewart
 Slam Stewart
 Sonny Stitt
 Savoy Sultans
 Hubert Sumlin
 Roosevelt Sykes
 Buddy Tate
 Koko Taylor
 Ed Thigpen
 James Thomas
 Charles Thompson
 Sonny Thompson
 Claude Tissendier
 Big Joe Turner
 Joe Turner
 Norris Turney
 Rene Urtreger
 Eddie Vinson
 Phillip Walker
 T-Bone Walker
 John Watkins
 Carl Weathersby
 Junior Wells
 Gerald Wiggins
 Bob Wilber
 Claude Williams
 Cootie Williams
 Mary Lou Williams
 Rubberlegs Williams
 Teddy Wilson
 Kai Winding
 Jimmy Witherspoon
 Booty Wood
 Chris Woods
 Phil Woods
 Mighty Joe Young
 Marcel Zanini

References

French record labels
Jazz record labels
Blues record labels
Record labels established in 1968
1968 establishments in France